Smash TV is a 1990 arcade video game created by Eugene Jarvis and Mark Turmell for Williams Electronics Games. It is a dual-stick shooter (one for moving and the other for firing) in the same vein as 1982's Robotron: 2084 (co-created by Jarvis). The Super NES, Genesis, Master System, and Game Gear versions are titled Super Smash TV.

The plot centers on a dystopian television show during the then-future year of 1999, where one or two contestants must shoot their way to fame and fortune; the show is taped in front of a live studio audience with broadcast via satellite worldwide. The goal of the game show is to kill or be killed, and once all of the challengers in each arena have been massacred, the contestant(s) will proceed to survive the next gauntlet.

Gameplay

The play mechanic is similar to that of Eugene Jarvis' earlier Robotron: 2084, with dual-joystick controls and series of single-screen arenas. While most of the enemies in Robotron are visible at the start of a level, in Smash TV they are generated in waves as a level progresses. Power-ups, some of which give the player a new weapon, are picked up by running over them.

The themes were borrowed from violent and dystopian sci-fi blockbuster films from 1987 such as RoboCop and The Running Man. The plot involves a wealthy celebrity named Master of Ceremonies (or MC for short) who is hosting and competing in his violent game show, in the not-too-distant future of 1999. MC has the playable contestant(s) moving from one high-tech gauntlet to the next, each player has to shoot hordes of enemies who enter via passages on each side of the screen while also collecting weapons, power-up items, and gift-wrapped prizes. The final room in each level is a protracted fight with a boss.

At the end of the game is a showdown with the show's host where players are granted their life and freedom. Among the game's items are keys. If enough are collected, players can access a bonus level called the Pleasure Dome where players can "collect" hundreds of blue bikini-clad blonde and buxom "babes" akin to other prizes in the game.

The game features verbal interjections from the game show host such as "Total carnage! I love it!" and "I'd buy that for a dollar!". The first of these became the title of the 1992 follow-up, Total Carnage. The second phrase came from a fictional TV show within RoboCop.

Development
Mark Turmell recounted, "When Hasbro pulled the plug on an interactive movie project I was working on, I went to Williams to design coin-op games. I moved to Chicago, hired John Tobias, and together we did our first coin-op, Smash T.V."

The announcer in the game is voiced by sound designer Paul Heitsch. The script was created by the game's composer and sound designer Jon Hey.

Originally the arcade game shipped without the Pleasure Dome bonus level implemented, although there was text mentioning it in the game. The design team had not been sure that players would actually get to the end of the game. However, players did finish the game and after arcade operators informed Williams of player complaints of being unable to finish it, the company sent out a new revision that included the Pleasure Dome level.

Ports
Smash TV was ported to the Nintendo Entertainment System, Super NES, Game Gear, Master System, and Sega Genesis consoles. Ocean published ports for the ZX Spectrum, Commodore 64, Amstrad CPC, Atari ST, and Amiga, all released in early 1992.

On some home systems such as the NES, players have the option to use the directional pad on the second controller to control the direction the character will shoot on-screen. Using this option for both players requires a multitap. The dual control aspect of the game works particularly well on the SNES, as its four main buttons, A, B, X and Y, are laid out like a D-pad, enabling the player to shoot in one direction while running in another.

Reception

The arcade game was generally well-received. The Amusement & Music Operators Association (AMOA) gave it the "most innovative game" award in 1990.

The home conversions of Smash TV received positive to mixed reviews.

The Amiga version scored 895 out of a possible 1,000 in a UK magazine review, and the Spectrum magazine CRASH awarded the ZX version 97%, making it a Crash Smash.

Accolades

In 1997 Electronic Gaming Monthly listed Smash TV as the 6th best arcade game of all time. In 2004, Smash TV was inducted into GameSpot's list of the greatest games of all time. In 1995, Total! rated Super Smash TV 51st on its Top 100 SNES Games stating: "Love it or hate it this is a superb conversion from the coin-op.  One of the most frantic blasters ever. In 1996, GamesMaster ranked the game 84th on their "Top 100 Games of All Time."

Legacy
The 1992 Williams arcade game Total Carnage shares many elements with Smash TV and was also programmed by Turmell, but is not a sequel.

Re-releases
Smash TV is part of Arcade Party Pak released for the PlayStation in 1999.

It is included in the Midway Arcade Treasures collection, which is available for Microsoft Windows, Nintendo GameCube, Xbox and PlayStation 2 and was released in 2003. These versions give the player the option to save high scores. Smash TV is also part of the 2012 compilation Midway Arcade Origins.

Smash TV was made available for download through Microsoft's Xbox Live Arcade service on the Xbox 360 and was the first version of the game to officially allow two players to play the game online. It was delisted from the service in February 2010 after the dissolution of Midway Games.

References

External links
Racketboy.com's Smash TV Podcast featuring interviews with Eugene Jarvis and Mark Turmell
Smash TV at Arcade History

Smash TV at Coinop.org

1990 video games
Amiga games
Amstrad CPC games
Arcade video games
Atari ST games
Commodore 64 games
Cooperative video games
Game Gear games
Head-to-head arcade video games
Twin-stick shooters
Nintendo Entertainment System games
Sega Genesis games
Master System games
Super Nintendo Entertainment System games
Video games developed in the United States
Williams video games
Xbox 360 Live Arcade games
ZX Spectrum games
Original Xbox Live Arcade games
Video games about death games
Video games scored by Jonathan Hey
Video games set in 1999
Fiction about death games
Ocean Software games